Aikaterini Mamouti (born 23 May 1981) is a Greek gymnast. She competed in six events at the 1996 Summer Olympics.

References

1981 births
Living people
Greek female artistic gymnasts
Olympic gymnasts of Greece
Gymnasts at the 1996 Summer Olympics
Gymnasts from Thessaloniki